Macedonian Radio Television (MRT), officially National Radio-Television since 2019, is the public broadcasting organisation of North Macedonia. It was founded in 1993 by the Assembly of the Republic of Macedonia.

Its legally defined service is the production and broadcasting of radio and television programmes of all genres, which should satisfy the public information, cultural, educational and recreational needs of the people of North Macedonia.

MRT is directed by Petar Karanakov. Karanakov supervises 1,200 MRT staffers.

History

Radio in Vardar Macedonia began in 1941, when Skopje was administrative capital of Vardar Banovina in Kingdom of Yugoslavia. On 27 January 1941 Radio Skoplje (Радио Скопље) started broadcasting in Serbian and retransmitting some programs from Radio Belgrade. On 20 April 1941 Radio Skopje was relaunched under Bulgarian control as Radio Skopie (Радио Скопие), retransmitting some programs from Radio Sofia.

Broadcasting in Macedonian began on 28 December 1944 as Radio Skopje (Радио Скопје) with the live transmission of the Second Session of ASNOM. TV Skopje started operation in 1964. In 1978 its first programme was renamed TVS 1.

Since 1991 Macedonian Radio and Television is an independent radio and television broadcaster. In July of 1993, MRT was admitted as a full active member of the European Broadcasting Union. MRT uses the acronym: MKRTV. With the enactment of the new broadcasting law on 24 April 1997, Macedonian Radio and Television was split into two parts: Macedonian radio-diffusion and Macedonian Radio-Television. According to article 77 of the broadcasting law, 61% of the collected broadcasting tax belongs to Macedonian Radio Television.

According to a government decision from March 2019, following the Prespa Agreement about renaming the country from "Macedonia" to "North Macedonia", MRT was officially renamed from "Macedonian Radio Television" to "National Radio Television" (Национална радиотелевизија).  it still broadcasts under its old name, the new name only being used by the government.

Services

Television
Macedonian Television broadcasts 73 hours of programmes daily on its three national terrestrial and two international satellite channels.

Terrestrial
MRT 1 broadcasts a generalist programming.
MRT 2 is centred towards the Albanian community of North Macedonia. 
MRT 3 broadcasts sports and entertainment.
MRT 4 caters to the different national minorities in the country, such as the Turkish, Serbian, Romany, Vlach and Bosnian communities. 
MRT 5 is focused towards children.
MRT Sobraniski Kanal was formed in 1991 as an experimental channel, but now it broadcasts the activities from the Assembly of the Republic of North Macedonia. 
All terrestrial channels air natively in high-definition.

Satellite
MRT Sat started in 2000 and broadcasts a continuous 24-hour programme, which are a selection of programmes from MRT, as well as special programming produced for the channel of 5 hours. 
MRT 2 Sat was introduced in 2012 and broadcasts a continuous 24-hour programme in Albanian.

Radio

The framework of the Macedonian Radio consists of three national channels, a satellite channel and a non-profit regional channel. It broadcasts 86.5 hours of programmes daily on its national and satellite channels. Macedonian Radio also broadcasts its programme over the Internet.

 The First channel, Radio Skopje, broadcasts a continuous 24-hour programme. It mainly functions as a talk radio.
 The Second channel, Radio 2, broadcasts a continuous 24-hour programme, too. It is focused on popular music and entertainment.
 The Third channel of Radio Skopje, broadcasts programmes in all the languages of the national minorities in North Macedonia, including Albanian (since 1948); Turkish (since 1945) 5 hours; Vlach (since 1991); Romany (since 1991); Serbian (since 2003) and Bosnian (since 2003) all 30 minutes each per day.
 The satellite channel, Radio Macedonia, commenced in July 2003, and broadcasts a 24-hour continual programme, which is a selection of programmes from Macedonian Radio and its original programme "Radio Macedonia" with a duration of 6 hours and 30 minutes.

Kanal 103 provides FM broadcasting only for the region of Skopje with the mission of promoting avant-garde music and culture.

Management
The process of transformation of MRTV in a public service broadcaster is not yet completed; it entailed the 1997 Law on Broadcasting Activities and the 2005 Broadcast Law. Editorial independence of MRTV is guaranteed by law but de facto lacking due to lack of independent funding and lack of independence of MRTV managerial bodies. MRTV executive directors in the last ten years remained close to the party in power. The network was funded by a license fee as well as by public budget contributions and advertising revenues (limited to 10% of airtime). Budgetary needs, and the practice of ad hoc state budgetary funding, has created a "culture of dependence" in MRTV.

MRTV is supervised by the MRTV Council, whose members are appointed by the Parliament upon proposal by "authorised nominators" from civil society. The Council then elects the members of MRTV Management Board. Although formally only accountable to the legislature through its annual report and budget plan, MRTV remains informally accountable to the executive, undermining institutional autonomy. MRTV also risks neglecting cultural pluralism obligations, in terms of programmes for minorities, as well as lacking impartiality and distance from government/majority politicians.

Notable people
Notable people who were employed in the Macedonian Radio Television include clarinetist and composer Tale Ognenovski who was a member of  the “Chalgii orchestra”, “Folk music orchestra” and “Authentic folk instruments orchestra” from 1960 until 1979.

See also
MRT Center

References

External links

Official website
Radio Skopje
Radio Bitola

Mass media companies of North Macedonia
Publicly funded broadcasters
European Broadcasting Union members
Multilingual broadcasters
Radio stations in North Macedonia
Radio stations established in 1944
Mass media companies established in 1944
Television channels and stations established in 1964
1944 establishments in the Socialist Republic of Macedonia